The Viceroy's Executive Council was the cabinet of the government of British India headed by the Viceroy of India. It is also known as the Council of the Governor-General of India. It was transformed from an advisory council into a cabinet consisting of five members heading revenue, military, law, finance and home by the Indian Councils Act 1861 giving recognition to the portfolio system introduced by Lord Canning in 1859. In 1874, a sixth member was added to be in charge of public works.

History
The Government of India Act 1858 transferred the power of the East India Company to the British Crown which was empowered to appoint a Viceroy and Governor-General of India to head the government in India. The advisory council of the Governor-General was based in the capital Calcutta and consisted of four members, three of which were appointed by the Secretary of State for India and one by the Sovereign.

The Indian Councils Act 1861 transformed the Viceroy of India's advisory council into a cabinet run on the portfolio system and increased the number of members by one. Three members were to be appointed by the Secretary of State for India, and two by the Sovereign. The five ordinary members took charge of a separate department: home, revenue, military, law and finance. The military Commander-in-Chief sat in with the council as an extraordinary member. The Viceroy was allowed, under the provisions of the Act, to overrule the council on affairs if he deemed it necessary. In 1869, the power to appoint all five members was passed to the Crown and in 1874, a new member was added to be in charge of public works.

The Indian Councils Act 1909 empowered the Governor General to nominate one Indian member to the Executive Council leading to the appointment of Satyendra Prasanna Sinha as the first Indian member. The Government of India Act 1919 increased the number of Indians in the council to three.

Indians in the Council (1909–1940)
 Law Members: Satyendra Prasad Sinha (1909–1914), P. S. Sivaswami Iyer (1912–1917), Syed Ali Imam, Muhammad Shafi (1924–1928), Tej Bahadur Sapru (1920–1923), Satish Ranjan Das, Brojendra Mitter (1931–1934), Nripendra Nath Sircar (1934–1939), Bepin Behari Ghose (1933), Nalini Ranjan Chatterjee
 C. Sankaran Nair (1915–1919): Education
Muhammad Shafi: Education (1919–1924)
B. N. Sarma (1920–1925): Revenue and Agriculture
Bhupendra Nath Mitra: Industries and Labour
Muhammad Habibullah (1925–1930): Education, Health and Lands
Fazl-i-Hussain (1930–1935)
C. P. Ramaswami Iyer: Law (1931–1932), Commerce (1932), Information (1942)
Kurma Venkata Reddy Naidu (1934–1937)
Muhammad Zafarullah Khan (1935–1941): Commerce (–1939), Law (1939–), Railway, Industries and Labour, and War Supply
Arcot Ramasamy Mudaliar: Commerce and Labour (1939–1941), Supply (1943)
Kunwar Sir Jagdish Prasad: Health, Education and Lands
Girija Shankar Bajpai (1940): Health, Education
Attaullah Tarar (1931–1941 ?)

Expansion in 1941 and 1942
On 8 August 1940, the Viceroy Lord Linlithgow made a proposal called the August Offer which expanded the Executive Council to include more Indians. These proposals were rejected by the Indian National Congress, All-India Muslim League and Hindu Mahasabha.

However they were revived the next year by Sir Tej Bahadur Sapru of the Liberal Party, and accepted by Viceroy who on the 22nd of July 1941 announced a reconstituted Executive Council where for the first time Indians outnumbered Britons.

In addition he announced a 30-member National Defence Council intended to coordinate the war effort between the central government, provincial governments (four of which had elected governments) and the princely states.

An attempt was made to maintain communal balance, but Jinnah as part of his effort to establish his position as the sole spokesman of the Indian Muslim community ordered all AIML members to resign from the Viceroy's Executive and National Defence councils as the Viceroy had not accepted his demand for 50% Muslim representation, nor consulted Jinnah on the selection of Muslim members.

On 2 July 1942 the Viceroy’s Council was again enlarged from 12 to 15. Sir Malik Feroz Khan Noon (ICS officer and High Commissioner in London) appointed Defence member, the first Indian to hold the post (key Congress demand). Sir Ramaswamy Mudaliar, a Tamil politician and Maharaja Jam Saheb Sri Digvijaysinhji Ranjitsinhji of Jamnagar were appointed to newly elevated positions as representatives of the Government of India to the Imperial War Cabinet in London and to Pacific War Council in Washington DC.

The council now consisted of:

Interim Government

As per the mid-June 1946 Cabinet Mission Plan, the Executive Council was expanded to consist of only Indian members except 
the Viceroy and the Commander-in-Chief intended to form the Interim Government of India until the transfer of power. The Viceroy, Viscount Wavell extended invitations for 14 members.

The Interim Government began to function from 2 September 1946 once the Indian National Congress members took their seats. However, the All-India Muslim League refused to participate until 26 October 1946. The Interim Government served until transfer of power to the Dominion of India and the Dominion of Pakistan on 15 August 1947.

Members of Interim Government

References

See also
 Central Legislative Assembly
 Council of State (India)
 Imperial Legislative Council

Government of British India
History of the government of India
1861 establishments in British India
1947 disestablishments in India